Inner Sanctum is a 1991 crime erotic thriller film which stars Tanya Roberts, Margaux Hemingway, Joseph Bottoms and Valerie Wildman, and was written by Mark Thomas McGee and directed by Fred Olen Ray.

The film was made for $650,000 and was very successful, leading to Ray making a series of erotic thrillers.

"I didn't really know what an erotic thriller was when I did Inner Sanctum", admitted Ray later. "I watched Wild Orchid—fast-forwarded through it, actually—to see what was expected of me."

Plot
Jennifer Reed, heiress to a huge fortune, believes that her husband Baxter, an insurance agent in Los Angeles, is unfaithful to her. Unable to reconcile with it, she takes a full pack of sleeping pills and falls down the stairs.

A few weeks later, Jennifer, now in a wheelchair, becomes even more jealous of her husband because he does not spend time with her, giving more attention to nurse Lynn Foster. Foster had previously been responsible for home care of a patient. After the patient died mysteriously, Nurse Foster married the widower, who then also died under mysterious circumstances.

Baxter attempts romance with his colleague Anna Rawlins, who does not reciprocate his feelings. Moreover, Baxter suspects that she wants to get rid of his wife. Jennifer discovers that someone has started following her, and her neighbor suspects Lynn. Complicating things, Jennifer carries a million dollar life insurance policy, which policy will not be paid in case of suicide, only murder.

Cast
 Tanya Roberts – Lynn Foster
 Margaux Hemingway – Anna Rawlins
 Joseph Bottoms – Baxter Reed
 Valerie Wildman – Jennifer Reed
 Brett Baxter Clark – Neil Semple
 Suzanne Ager – Maureen
 Jay Richardson –Lieutenant Wanamaker 
 William Butler – Jeff Seigel
 Ted Newsom – Sergeant Levy

Sequel
The film's success led to a sequel Inner Sanctum II in 1994, also directed by Fred Ray, and starring Michael Nouri, Tracy Brooks Swope (as Jennifer Reed), Sandahl Bergman, David Warner, and Margaux Hemingway (reprising her role of Anna Rawlins).

References

External links

1991 films
1991 crime thriller films
Films directed by Fred Olen Ray
American crime thriller films
1990s erotic thriller films
American erotic thriller films
1991 drama films
1990s English-language films
1990s American films